Princess Tarakanova  is a 1910 Russian short film directed by Kai Hansen.

Plot 
The film is based on the play  Princess Tarakanova  by Ippolit Shpazhinsky.

The story of the alleged daughter of the secret marriage of Empress Elizabeth of Russia, who allegedly died tragically during the flood in the casemate of the Peter and Paul Fortress, where she was transferred by the will of Catherine II after a life sentence.

Cast
  V. Mikulina  as Princess Tarakanova
 N. Aleksandrova  as Catherine II
 Nikolai Vekov as Count Orlov
  S. Lazarev  as Golitsyn
  Nadezhda Nelskaya  as Francesca de Mechade
 Anatoly Rzhanov as Tolstoy
  F. Semkovsky  as Samuel Greig
 Nikolai Vasilyev as Potyomkin

Criticism
Before us is a series of historical figures with amazing truth. Nothing is missed in the sense of preserving the character of the era, life, costumes to the last detail. This film is a major event in the film market, and we are deeply confident in its insane success.

See also
 Tarakanova (1930)
 Princess Tarakanova (1938)
 Shadow of the Eagle (1950)
 The Rival of the Empress (1951)

References

External links 
 

1910 films
1910s Russian-language films
Russian silent short films
Russian black-and-white films
Films directed by Kai Hansen
Films of the Russian Empire
Films about Catherine the Great
Pathé films
1910 short films